The 1914 Tulane Olive and Blue football team was an American football team that represented Tulane University as a member of the Southern Intercollegiate Athletic Association (SIAA) during the 1914 college football season. In its first year under head coach Edwin Sweetland, Tulane compiled a 3–3–1 record.

Schedule

References

Tulane
Tulane Green Wave football seasons
Tulane Olive and Blue football